A New English Dictionary: or, a complete collection of the most proper and significant words, commonly used in the language was an English dictionary compiled by philologist John Kersey and first published in London in 1702.

Unlike previous dictionaries, which had focused on documenting difficult words, A New English Dictionary was one of the first to focus on words in common usage. It was also the first to be written by a professional lexicographer.

Kersey later continued his lexicographic career by enlarging Edward Phillips' The New World of English Words in 1706 and editing the Dictionarium Anglo-Britannicum in 1708.

The original title of the Oxford English Dictionary was A New English Dictionary on Historical Principles, and it was sometimes given the abbreviation NED, for New English Dictionary.

English dictionaries
1702 books